Jakub Kornfeil (born 8 April 1993) is a Grand Prix motorcycle racer from the Czech Republic. Until 2019, he competed in the Moto3 World Championship. During 2020 he raced for WithU Motorsport in the MotoE World Cup. He was the winner of Red Bull MotoGP Rookies Cup in 2009.

Kornfeil is a competitive jet surfer, who, in 2015, became the first ever MotoSurf GP World Champion.

Career

Early career
Born in Kyjov, Kornfeil started racing competitively in supermoto from the age of eight years, winning the 65 cc championship in 2002. Championships at national and European level in minibikes followed, as well as the Czech Republic 125GP Championship in 2007, before Kornfeil moved into the Red Bull Rookies Cup in 2008. Kornfeil finished eight of the season's ten races in the top ten places, as he finished ninth overall, tying on points with Daniel Ruiz. His second season in the championship was more successful, with top-eight finishes in every race, with three wins in the final four races enabling him to overhaul Sturla Fagerhaug by just two points. He also finished fourth in the Italian 125GP championship.

125cc World Championship
After securing the Red Bull Rookies Cup, Kornfeil stepped up to Grand Prix level, making five appearances in the class towards the end of the season with the Loncin team, replacing Alexis Masbou. Kornfeil finished four of the races with a best result of 19th at the Malaysian Grand Prix.

Kornfeil and Tomoyoshi Koyama both moved from the Loncin team to make up Racing Team Germany's lineup for the  season. Although Koyama outscored his much less experienced team-mate, Kornfeil amassed 28 points from nine points-scoring finishes to end up 17th in the final championship standings. His best result in the season was a fifth place finish at his home Grand Prix which was held in damp conditions.

Moto3 World Championship
In 2015, Kornfeil achieved his best result with a second place finish in wet conditions at Silverstone. He added another podium finish at Valencia, as he finished twelfth in the final championship standings. In 2016, Kornfeil achieved his best result in championship with an 8th place, he added another podium finish in Malaysia. In Czech Republic, 2018 he added a pole position and podium finish, and in France of the same year he was known for his stunt jump after Enea Bastianini crashed.

Career statistics

Red Bull MotoGP Rookies Cup

Races by year
(key) (Races in bold indicate pole position, races in italics indicate fastest lap)

Grand Prix motorcycle racing

By season

By class

Races by year
(key) (Races in bold indicate pole position, races in italics indicate fastest lap)

References

External links

125cc World Championship riders
Czech motorcycle racers
1993 births
Living people
Moto3 World Championship riders
People from Kyjov
MotoE World Cup riders
Sportspeople from the South Moravian Region